Berazan or Barazan may refer to:
 Barazan, Kurdistan
 Berazan, West Azerbaijan